FK Nikars Riga is a futsal club based in Riga, Latvia. It has been one of the dominant teams in the Latvian Futsal Higher League, winning 11 championship titles in a row from 2008 to 2019.

In June 2019, the club announced that it will disband its main team and withdraw from national and European tournaments. However, there had been reports of financial issues in the previous seasons, with the LFF stating that after the 2018-19 season the club was likely to be relegated due to long-time financial irregularities.

Honours
Latvian Futsal Premier League champions (11) 
 2007–08, 2008–09, 2009–10, 2010–11, 2011–12, 2012–13, 2013–14, 2015–16, 2016–17, 2017–18, 2018–19

Current squad

References

External links
Club Official Website
 club profile at footballzz.co.uk

Futsal clubs in Latvia
Futsal clubs established in 2002
2002 establishments in Latvia